Lawton Park and Pavilion is a historic public park and national historic district located at Hartsville, Darlington County, South Carolina.  The district encompasses two contributing buildings built 1939-1941 by the Works Progress Administration, and planned as early as 1938. The park is a wooded, 3.5 acre, public recreation area including a swimming area, playground, picnic area, and tennis courts. The park includes three buildings: a Colonial Revival style pavilion, shed and keeper's house.

It was listed on the National Register of Historic Places in 1991.

References

External links
 Lawton Park - City of Hartsville

Works Progress Administration in South Carolina
Event venues on the National Register of Historic Places in South Carolina
Historic districts on the National Register of Historic Places in South Carolina
Colonial Revival architecture in South Carolina
Protected areas of Darlington County, South Carolina
National Register of Historic Places in Darlington County, South Carolina
Parks in South Carolina
Buildings and structures in Hartsville, South Carolina
Parks on the National Register of Historic Places in South Carolina